Nazeer Ahmed (also known as Rank Nazeer) is an Indian Muslim scholar, politician, historian and translator.

He is the author of the Encyclopedia of Islamic History (www.historyofislam.com). He is a former politician of Indian National Congress, a former Member of Legislative Assembly from Karnataka, and Member of Karnataka Knowledge Commission, Government of Karnataka.

Early life
He was born in Tumkur in the state of Mysore, India in 1939. His father Abdul Azeem was a spiritual scholar of the Sufi Qadiri order. In 1952, he achieved the first rank in the entire state of Mysore and won the Maharaja of Mysore Gold Medal. He has been known as “Rank Nazeer Ahmed” due to the consistency with which he ranked first in state and interstate exams.

He entered the California Institute of Technology (Caltech) in 1961 as an Institute Scholar as well as a Tata Scholar. He was awarded MS and AeE degrees from Caltech. He worked in Huntsville, Alabama on the Saturn, Apollo and Lunar Land Rover Projects at the Marshall Space Flight Center in 1964–65. He obtained a PhD in Theoretical and Applied Mechanics from Cornell University in 1967. Under Peter Drucker he studied management at New York University. He then obtained an MBA from Rider University, New Jersey.

Teachers 
He received his early religious training from Molvi Abdul Quddus Qudsi and he continues to be a student of Nazim al-Haqqani.

Political career
In 1977, he was elected a member of the Karnataka Legislative Assembly from the 57th constituency but resigned a year later. In 1988 he was elected a delegate to the Democratic National Convention, 42nd Congressional District in California. In 1992 he was a candidate for US Congress, 46 CA Congressional District.

Charity work 
The charities he founded in Tumkur, India, have given out millions in scholarships to poor children of all faiths and has built schools, mosques, and a unique Idgah with spiritual themes.

Books 
Among his books are the following:
 Islam in Global History, in two volumes was published in the United States and translated into Urdu and Persian.
 The Qur'an: An English Translation, was done over a period of three years, between 2007 and 2010, although some of this work was done as early as 1972.

See also 
 Musharraf Hussain
 Nurettin Uzunoğlu
 Ahmed Hulusi
 Ali Ünal

References

External links 
 History of Islam – An encyclopedia of Islamic history, founded by Dr. Nazeer Ahmed

1939 births
Living people
Kannada people
People from Tumkur district
Karnataka MLAs 1978–1983
Indian National Congress politicians from Karnataka
Indian National Congress (Organisation) politicians
Cornell University alumni
California Institute of Technology alumni
Rider University alumni
Translators of the Quran into English
Indian Sunni Muslim scholars of Islam
Indian Sufis